Langenselbold is a town in the Main-Kinzig district, in Hesse, Germany. It is situated on the river Kinzig, 10 km east of Hanau. In 2009, the town hosted the 49th Hessentag state festival.

References

Towns in Hesse
Main-Kinzig-Kreis